The Monaco national football team is a national side that represents Monaco in association football. The team is controlled by the Monégasque Football Federation, the governing body for all football in Monaco. Monaco is not a member of FIFA or UEFA, and therefore cannot enter the FIFA World Cup nor the UEFA European Championship. Monaco was a founding member of the N.F.-Board in 2003, and finished second in the 2006 VIVA World Cup inaugural edition. However, due to political opposition, Monaco severed ties with the organization in 2010.

History

Beginnings
After the foundation of the Monégasque Football Federation in April 2000, Monaco played its first match in June of the same year against Gibraltar, losing 5–0. After this match, Monaco would return to play a match a year later against Tibet, in Freiburg, in Germany, winning 2–1.

Overview
Since 2001, Monaco has participated in twenty-seven games, winning eight, drawing six, and losing thirteen. The team competes against local clubs, nations, unrecognized states, people groups, and territories. Monaco is managed by Martino López, and competes at the Stade Didier Deschamps in Cap-d'Ail, France. According to Elo Ratings, Monaco is ranked 200th in the world as of November 2020.

The team's roster is composed of roughly sixty men; only five offer professional experience, since the team is mainly made up of civil servants and employees of the Société des bains de mer de Monaco.

Competitive record

Results

2000s

2010s

Unofficial results

Head-to-head record

As of 27 April 2017

Honours
VIVA World Cup runner-up: 2006

See also
Football in Monaco
Monégasque Football Federation
Non-FIFA international football

References

External links

Football in Monaco
CONIFA member associations
European N.F.-Board teams
National sports teams of Monaco